Edward Sullivan may refer to:

Edward Sullivan (Medal of Honor) (1870–1955), Medal of Honor recipient
Sir Edward Sullivan, 1st Baronet (1822–1885), Lord Chancellor of Ireland
Edward C. Sullivan (born 1934), former New York State Assemblyman
Edward J. Sullivan (1921–2007), mayor of Cambridge, Massachusetts
Edward Sullivan (bishop) (1832–1899), Canadian Anglican priest
Ed Sullivan (1901–1974), American entertainment writer and television host
Ed Sullivan, Jr. (born 1969), Republican member of the Illinois House of Representatives

See also
Ted Sullivan (disambiguation)
Edmund Sullivan